Black Cat is an anime series adapted from the manga of the same title by Kentaro Yabuki. First announced in May 2005, it was produced by Gonzo with directed by Shin Itagaki.  The series follows the legendary assassin Train Heartnet, known as Black Cat, who becomes a bounty hunter, dubbed Sweeper.

Black Cat premiered in Japan on October 6, 2005, on Animax and Tokyo Broadcasting System (TBS), and aired for 24 episodes, ending on March 30, 2006. The first 20 episodes adapt the entirety of Yabuki's manga, while the last four episodes feature a completely original, self-contained story arc. The 15th episode was broadcast exclusively on Animax. In Japan, the series was released across twelve Region 2 DVD volumes from December 21, 2005, to November 22, 2006. Each volume was also published in a Premium Edition which included various extras. The DVD volumes were gathered in a limited release DVD boxset by Sony Pictures Entertainment on April 23, 2008.

In June 2006, Black Cat was licensed by Funimation for an English-language release in North America. The dubbed episodes were broadcast on Funimation Channel in 2009. The series was then released across six Region 1 DVD volumes released between December 19, 2006, and July 24, 2007. The DVDs were gathered in a boxset and released on March 18, 2008.

The music from the series was composed by Taku Iwasaki. Three pieces of theme music are used for the series: a single opening theme and two closing themes. The opening theme, titled , is performed by Yorico.


Episode list
Half of the episodes do not follow the manga exactly, with one episode being filler; the first seven being an alternative origin of Train meeting Saya, Sven and Eve, and the last four are an original arc called the Zero Numbers.

See also

 Black Cat (manga)
 List of Black Cat chapters
 List of Black Cat characters

References
General

Specific

External links
TBS's Black Cat anime official site 

Black Cat